Vyacheslav Failyevich Rafikov (born 19 March 1986) is a former Russian professional football player.

Club career
He played for the main squad of FC Shinnik Yaroslavl in the Russian Cup.

He made his Russian Football National League debut for FC Anzhi Makhachkala on 7 April 2007 in a game against FC Tekstilshchik-Telekom Ivanovo.

External links
 

1986 births
Living people
Russian footballers
Association football midfielders
FC Shinnik Yaroslavl players
FC Anzhi Makhachkala players
FC SKA Rostov-on-Don players
FC Volga Nizhny Novgorod players
FC Olimpia Volgograd players
FC Izhevsk players
FC Mashuk-KMV Pyatigorsk players